The Minnesota State Mavericks men's ice hockey statistical leaders are individual statistical leaders of the Minnesota-Duluth Bulldogs men's ice hockey program in various categories, including goals, assists, points, and saves. Within those areas, the lists identify single-game, single-season, and career leaders. The Bulldogs represent University of Minnesota Duluth in the NCAA's National Collegiate Hockey Conference.

Minnesota-Duluth began competing in intercollegiate ice hockey in 1930.  These lists are updated through the end of the 2020–21 season.

Goals

Assists

Points

Saves

References

Lists of college ice hockey statistical leaders by team
Statistical